The 1986 FIFA World Cup qualification AFC first round was part of the AFC qualifying tournament for the 1986 FIFA World Cup. 27 national teams were separated into an Eastern and Western zone where they were split into groups of 3 or 4, with the group winners progressing to the second round.

The teams which qualified for the second round were United Arab Emirates, Iraq, Syria, Bahrain, South Korea, Indonesia, Hong Kong and Japan.

India entered the world cup qualifiers for the first time after 35 year wait. The last time they entered, they had directly qualified for the 1950 edition of the  world cup.

West Asia Zone

Group 1A

Group 1B

Lebanon played 4 matches before withdrawing, their results were annulled.

Group 2A

Group 2B

Iran disqualified for refusing to play matches on neutral ground

East Asia Zone

Group 3A

Group 3B

Group 4A

Group 4B

References

External links
 FIFA.com Reports
 RSSSF Page
 Results and scorers

1